The 1937 Traktor Stalingrad season was the 2nd season in USSR championships.

Squad 

 (captain)

Transfers

In:

Out:

Competitions

Friendlies

Soviet Cup

USSR Championship. Group IV

Table

Statistics

Squad Statistics

Appearances and goals

|}
Note: The seven goals scored are not considered because unknown who goalscorers in Tractor Stalingrad – Dynamo Saratov.

Top Scorers

Note: The seven goals scored are not considered because unknown who goalscorers in Tractor Stalingrad – Dynamo Saratov.

General Statistics

Sources
 
 

FC Rotor Volgograd seasons
Traktor Stalingrad
1937 in Soviet football